Thiran may refer to:
Thiran Dhanapala, Sri Lankan cricketera
Patrick Thiran, Swiss engineer

Sinhalese masculine given names